Labola Nambalfo is a town in the Tiéfora Department of Comoé Province in south-western Burkina Faso. The town has a population of 1,025.

References

Populated places in the Cascades Region
Comoé Province